Sambong station is a railway station in Sambong-rodongjagu, Onsŏng County, North Hamgyŏng, North Korea, on the Hambuk Line of the Korean State Railway.

History
Originally called Sangsambong station (Upper Sambong station), it was opened by the Tomun Railway Company on 5 January 1920, together with the rest of the Hoeryŏng–Sangsambong section of their line (Hoeryŏng–Tonggwanjin), which on 1 April 1929 was nationalised and became the West Tomun Line of the Chosen Government Railway. It received its current name after Hasambong station (Lower Sambong station) was closed in 1933, making the "Upper" prefix redundant.

References

Railway stations in North Korea
Railway stations opened in 1920